Roy Peck (May 16, 1922 – February 26, 1983) was an American politician. He served as a Republican member of the Wyoming House of Representatives and the Wyoming Senate.

Life and career 
Peck was born in Rugby, North Dakota. He attended the University of Wyoming.

In 1971, Peck was elected to the Wyoming House of Representatives, serving until 1974, when he was a Republican candidate for governor of Wyoming. In 1977, he was elected to the Wyoming Senate, serving until 1983.

Peck died in February 1983 of a heart attack, at the age of 60.

References 

1922 births
1983 deaths
People from Rugby, North Dakota
Republican Party members of the Wyoming House of Representatives
Republican Party Wyoming state senators
20th-century American politicians
University of Wyoming alumni